"What Kind of Man" is a single by Canadian country music artist Joel Feeney. Released in 1995, it was the fifth single from his album ...Life Is but a Dream. The song reached #1 on the RPM Country Tracks chart in May 1995.

Charts

Weekly charts

Year-end charts

References

1995 singles
Joel Feeney songs
Songs written by Joel Feeney
Songs written by Chris Farren (country musician)
Song recordings produced by Chris Farren (country musician)
1993 songs
MCA Records singles